Edward Anthony Mechling (January 31, 1878 in Hosensack, Pennsylvania – March 5, 1938 in Moorestown, New Jersey) was an American track and field athlete who competed at the 1900 Summer Olympics in Paris, France.

Mechling competed in the 800 metres.  He placed fourth or fifth in his first-round (semifinals) heat and did not advance to the final.

References

External links 

 De Wael, Herman. Herman's Full Olympians: "Athletics 1900". Accessed 18 March 2006.
 

1878 births
1938 deaths
Athletes (track and field) at the 1900 Summer Olympics
Olympic track and field athletes of the United States
American male middle-distance runners
Sportspeople from Lehigh County, Pennsylvania
Track and field athletes from Pennsylvania
Penn Quakers men's track and field athletes